The Hutch is the third studio album by Belgian group Steak Number Eight, released throughout Spring 2013 in the Benelux (March 18), Norway (April 19) and Europe (April 22). The album is released on the back of extensive touring throughout Europe in support of second album All is Chaos, including on Metal Hammer's Razor Tour in the UK. The first song, "Black Eyed", was released on 27 February 2013. A full stream was released on De Standaard on March 11. The album reached #21 in the Belgian album charts.

Track listing

Personnel

Steak Number Eight
Brent Vanneste – guitars/vocals
Joris Casier – drums
Jesse Surmont – bass
Cis Deman – guitars

Production
Reinhard Vanbergen – production
Matt Bayles – mixing
Howie Weinberg – mastering

Charts

Weekly charts

Year-end charts

References

Steak Number Eight albums
2013 albums